Matteo Galvan (born 24 August 1988) is an Italian sprinter who specializes in the 200 and 400 metres. His career highlight so far is the 2009 European Indoor Championships, where he placed sixth in the 400 metres and won a gold medal in the relay.

He also won seven national championships at individual senior level from 2008 to 2016 in three different specialities of the sprinting (100, 200 and 400 metres).

Biography
Galvan was born in Vicenza. He won the bronze medal in the 200 metres at the 2005 World Youth Championships, in a personal best time of 21.14 seconds. At the 2006 World Junior Championships he was named as one of the prime members of the Italian squad. He did reach the final round of the 200 metres, but was disqualified. He also competed in the 4 x 100 metres relay, but without reaching the final round. In 2006 he achieved personal best times in the 100 and 200 metres, with 10.54 and 20.87 seconds respectively, both times set in July in Rieti.

2007 and 2008 were low-key seasons for Galvan. He ran the 200 metres in 20.96 in June 2007, and the 400 metres in 47.10 in September 2007. He repeated this exact time in February 2008 in Genoa, during the indoor season.

In February 2009 he ran the 400 metres in 46.26, at the Italian indoor championships in Turin. At that time it was the third fastest time in Europe and the sixth fastest in the world during the 2008–09 indoor season. The 2009 European Indoor Championships was staged in the same city the next month, and, competing in the 400 metres, Galvan managed to place sixth in the final with the time 48.23. On the next day he won a gold medal in the 4 x 400 metres relay, together with teammates Jacopo Marin, Domenico Rao and Claudio Licciardello. Galvan ran the second leg.

National record
 400 metres: 45.12 (Rieti, june 2016). Current record established at the 2016 Italian Championships.

Achievements

National titles
 Italian Athletics Championships
 100 metres: 2011
 200 metres: 2008
 400 metres: 2009, 2013, 2014, 2015, 2016, 2019

See also
 Italian records in athletics
 Italian all-time lists - 400 metres
 Italy national relay team

References

External links

1988 births
Living people
Italian male sprinters
Athletics competitors of Fiamme Gialle
Athletes (track and field) at the 2016 Summer Olympics
Olympic athletes of Italy
Sportspeople from Vicenza
Mediterranean Games gold medalists for Italy
Mediterranean Games silver medalists for Italy
Athletes (track and field) at the 2009 Mediterranean Games
Athletes (track and field) at the 2013 Mediterranean Games
World Athletics Championships athletes for Italy
Mediterranean Games medalists in athletics
Italian Athletics Championships winners
21st-century Italian people